Northbrook School District 27 is a school district located in Northbrook, Illinois.

Overview
Northbrook District 27 is a school district in Northbrook, Illinois. It consists of three schools, Hickory Point, Shabonee, and Wood Oaks Junior High School. The district used to have a fourth school, Grove but it was shut down and destroyed in June 2010 after a decision by the board of education. There also used to be a school called Indian Ridge, but this closed in 1982. The building was sold off to the Northbrook Park District, and now operates as the Northbrook Leisure Center. Hickory point and Shabonee are elementary schools which run from Kindergarten to 5th grade. After 5th grade, students are transferred to Wood Oaks Junior High school, which teach grades 6–8. The district prides itself in providing students with many accommodations such as disabilities, or accelerated learning. As well as that, the district provides students with some of the newest technology, and students are provided with a Lenovo Chromebook in 6th grade to take home with them for schoolwork.

Schools
Hickory Point (Grades K-2)
Shabonee (Grades 3–5)
Wood Oaks Junior High School (Grades 6–8)
Grove (closed in June 2010) (Grades K-3)
Indian Ridge (closed in 1982)

Board of education
As of 2018, the Board of Education has seven members as follows.
 Mrs. Helen Melnick, Board President
 Mrs. Laurie Garber-Amram, Board Vice President
 Mrs. Melissa Copeland
 Mr. Ed Feld
 Mr. Alex Frum
 Mr. Brian Paich
 Mrs. Martha Carlos

Superintendents
Dr. David Kroeze (Superintendent)
Dr. Theresa Fournier (Assistant Superintendent for Personnel and Student Services)
Dr. Katharine Olson (Assistant Superintendent for Curriculum, Instruction & Assessment)
Dr. Kimberly Arakelian (Assistant Superintendent for Finance & Operations)

School principals
Wood Oaks -  Cari Beake
Shabonee - Dr. John Panozzo
Grove (closed in June 2010) - Mrs. Adrienne Moseley
Hickory Point - Ms. Maureen Deely

Assistant Principals 

 Hickory Point - Meggan Buchanan
 Shabonee - Meggan Buchanan
 Wood Oaks - Paul Saminski

References

External links

 Northbrook School District 27

Northbrook, Illinois
School districts in Cook County, Illinois